KEXL (97.5 FM) is a radio station broadcasting an adult contemporary format.  Licensed to Pierce, Nebraska, United States, the station is currently owned by WJAG, Inc. and features programming from Westwood One and Fox News Radio.

The station, which was launched in 2009, takes its call letters and format from another station owned by the same company, which is now known as KQKX and has a country music format.

References

External links

EXL